The Donald Von Raesfeld Power Plant (DVRPP) is a natural gas power plant in Santa Clara, California, operated by Silicon Valley Power.  Located near the San Jose International Airport it began operations in 2005 with a peak capacity of 147 megawatts.

DVRPP is a two-on-one combined cycle power plant, combining the output of two 50 MW combustion turbines with one 22MW steam turbine. The steam is generated from the heated exhaust from each combustion turbine, and steam output may be increased to meet peaking demands by using exhaust duct-mounted natural gas burners.

Infrastructure co-location 
Santa Clara has been touted as the "data center capital of Silicon Valley" in part spurred by low power rates from Silicon Valley Power. DVRPP, along with a major Silicon Valley Power substation a block away, provide redundant high capacity power sources. In close proximity are major long-haul hubs for several Tier 1 Internet backbone providers for redundant high capacity Internet connection. Many large private and co-location data centers are located in or near Santa Clara, specifically the area surrounding DVRPP bounded by Hwy 101, Lafayette St, Central Expressway, Scott Boulevard and San Tomas Expressway.

See also
List of power stations in California

References

Natural gas-fired power stations in California
Buildings and structures in Santa Clara, California
Economy of Santa Clara, California
Science and technology in the San Francisco Bay Area
2005 establishments in California
Environment of the San Francisco Bay Area
Energy in the San Francisco Bay Area